8/11 may refer to:
August 11 (month-day date notation)
November 8 (day-month date notation)